Death Acoustic is a solo acoustic record by American musician Nick Oliveri. The album contains mostly cover songs of bands Oliveri is involved in directly or is a fan of. Bands covered include Raw Power, GG Allin, Moistboyz, Kyuss, Queens of the Stone Age, The Misfits, and The Dwarves.

On January 15, 2010 the album was nominated for a High Times 2010 Doobie Award in the "Best Alternative Rock Artist" category. The winning nominees were awarded on March 21, 2010.

Track listing
"Start A Fight" - 2:22 (Mauro)
"Invisible Like The Sky" - 2:46 (Oliveri)
"Dairy Queen" - 2:49 (Dahlia)
"I'm Gonna Leave You" - 3:28 (Homme/Oliveri)
"Love Has Passed Me By" - 3:07 (Kyuss)
"U Blow" - 4:29 (Dickie Moist/Mickey Moist)
"Hybrid Moments" - 2:08 (Glenn Danzig)
"Unless I Can Kill" - 1:37 (Oliveri)
"Follow Me" - 2:07 (Dahlia)
"Outlaw Scumfuc" - 5:24 (GG Allin/Oliveri)

Credits
Recorded and produced by Nick Oliveri except "Outlaw Scumfuc" recorded by Bradley Cook
Additional guitar on "Outlaw Scumfuc" by Chris Henry
Mastered by Rock O'neil at Turtlerock
Design and layout Carl Whitbread

References

2009 albums
Nick Oliveri albums